Koichi Kishi may refer to:  

Koichi Kishi (politician) (1940-2017), Japanese politician of the Liberal Democratic Party
Koichi Kishi (composer) (1909-1937), Japanese composer, conductor and violinist